Higher education in Milwaukee, Wisconsin is dominated by the University of Wisconsin–Milwaukee on the East Side and Marquette University, located near the city's center. Between no fewer than eleven higher education institutions, the city has a collective, full-time, degree seeking college student population exceeding approximately 70,000, the largest in Wisconsin. A January 2000 study from McGill University ranked Milwaukee 6th in a list of U.S. and Canadian cities with the highest number of college students per capita.  

Also serving Milwaukee-area students are local campuses of Upper Iowa University and Ottawa University, which has a campus in Brookfield, Wisconsin.

List of colleges and universities in Milwaukee 

 Alverno College
 Cardinal Stritch University
 Concordia University Wisconsin (Mequon Campus)
 Lakeland College (West Allis/Milwaukee Campus) 
 Marquette University
 Medical College of Wisconsin
 Milwaukee Area Technical College
 Milwaukee Institute of Art and Design
 Milwaukee School of Engineering
 Mount Mary University
 University of Wisconsin–Milwaukee
 Wisconsin Conservatory of Music
 Wisconsin Lutheran College

References

Universities and colleges in Milwaukee